The Magistrate is a 1989 mini series about an Italian investigative magistrate fighting the Mafia. His search causes the death of his wife and the disappearance of his son. The crimes lead him to Australia, where he discovers a landscape of political and police corruption, business fraud, media intrigue, drugs smuggling and illegal arms dealing which stretches all the way from Italy to Australia and into the Pacific.

Cast
 Franco Nero as Paolo Pizzi
 Catherine Wilkin as Claire Boyd
 Dennis Miller as Roger Davies
 Julia Blake as Jean Shaw
 Steve Bastoni as Robbie Shaw
 Victoria Rowland as Nicole Davidson
 Joe Petruzzi as Leonardo Pizzi
 Paul Sonkkila as Hannaford
 Andy Anderson as Tony
 Caroline Gillmer as Sandy
 Rod Mullinar as Ian Walters
 Anthony Hawkins as Douglas Shaw
 Jon Fabian as Francesco Pinneri

References

External links

1980s Australian television miniseries
1989 Australian television series debuts
1989 Australian television series endings
1989 television films
1989 films
Films about organized crime in Italy
English-language television shows
Films directed by Kathy Mueller